Otse is a village in Central District of Botswana. It is located ca. 100 km west of Mahalapye. Otse has a primary school, and the population was 973 in 2001 census.

References

Populated places in Central District (Botswana)
Villages in Botswana